Leigh-Anne Eldredge (born December 14, 1964) is an American former professional tennis player.

Biography
Eldredge was born in Pasadena played college tennis at Stanford for four years. A three-time All-American, she partnered with Linda Gates to win the 1985 NCAA Division I doubles title.

From 1987 to 1989, Eldredge competed on the professional tour and reached a best singles ranking of 112 in the world. She featured in the main draw of all four grand slam tournaments, which included a third round appearance at the 1988 Australian Open. Her best performance on the WTA Tour came at the 1989 Wellington Classic, where she made it through to the semi-finals.

References

External links
 
 

1964 births
Living people
American female tennis players
Stanford Cardinal women's tennis players
Tennis people from California
Sportspeople from Pasadena, California